Joseph Ray Laws (June 16, 1911 – August 22, 1979) was an American football player.  He played his entire career with the Green Bay Packers, winning three World Championships, and was inducted into the Green Bay Packers Hall of Fame in 1972.  Prior to joining the Packers, Laws attended the University of Iowa where he was a member of Sigma Pi fraternity.  While at Iowa he was named All-Big Ten quarterback and the Big Ten Most Valuable Player in 1933.  On December 17, 1944 Joe Laws set an NFL postseason record (since broken), by intercepting 3 passes in the Packers' 14-7 victory over the Giants in the league title game.

References

External links
 Des Moines Register
 

1911 births
1979 deaths
People from Colfax, Iowa
American football halfbacks
Green Bay Packers players
Iowa Hawkeyes football players
Players of American football from Iowa